Ian Hirst is an Irish rugby union player for Leinster Rugby. His preferred position is loosehead prop. It was announced in April 2015 that he had been awarded a senior contract with Leinster following an impressive amateur career with Clontarf FC

References

Irish rugby union players
Living people
1989 births
Rugby union props